Scolopocryptopidae is a family of blind centipedes. The number of leg-bearing segments is fixed at 23 for species in this family, which distinguishes the species in this family from all other centipede species.

Genera
 Dinocryptops
 Ectonocryptoides
 Ectonocryptops
 Kartops
 Kethops
 Newportia
 Scolopocryptops
 Thalkethops
 Tidops

References

External links 
 Encyclopedia of Life entry

Centipede families
Scolopendromorpha